Epermenia petrusellus is a moth of the family Epermeniidae. It is found in France, Austria, the Czech Republic, Slovakia, Croatia, Hungary, Romania and Greece. There are also records from the Kaluga Oblast, Russia, and from western Ukraine, but these records are doubtful and may be a misidentifications of Epermenia falciformis.

The wingspan is about 15 mm.

The larvae feed on Peucedanum alsaticum and Peucedanum montanum.

References

Moths described in 1883
Epermeniidae
Moths of Europe